Southport Wall Sidings are located in Southport, Merseyside, England, on the  Merseyrail Northern Line adjacent to Southport station.

Present 
Stabling is provided for Merseyrail Class 507 and Class 508 EMUs.

References 

 Railway sidings in England